Duchy of Pannonia may refer to:

 March of Pannonia, the frontier march of the Carolingian Empire
 Duchy of Pannonian Croatia, a medieval duchy in the 9th century